Wilhemina Iwanowska (September 2, 1905 - May 16, 1999) was born in Vilnius (Wilno). Iwanowska was an astronomer and the first astrophysics professor in Poland. Iwanowska was pioneer of astrophysics in Polish science.

Childhood and family 
Wilhemina Iwanowska was born to a noble family on the borderlands of Poland, however, she did not come from money.

Work and education 
Wilhemina Iwanowska began her studies in Wilno at the University of Stefan Batory(USB) in mathematics. Iwanowska also began working at the University in 1927. At the University, Iwanowska studied under Juliusz Rudnicki and earned her Master's degree in analytic functions in 1929. Then, in 1933, she received her D.Sc (Doctor of Science) in astronomy. By 1937, Iwanowska received her Docent degree in astronomy.

Iwanowska's astronomical career during her studies at the University. In 1926, Iwanowska was approached by Władysław Dziewulski, a professor at the University. Dziewulski offered Iwanowska a job at the Astronomical Observatory of the Jagiellonian University. Thus, by 1927, Iwanowska's profession as an astronomer began, a time period which included the rise of astrophysics in Polish science and its early accomplishments.

From 1934 to 1935, Dr. Iwanowska focused on astronomical spectroscopy during her internship at the Stockholm Observatory. In 1937 at USB, she presented her post-doctoral dissertation where "she characterized stellar supergiants based on the analysis of their spectral features."

From 1945 to 1999, Iwanowska worked at the University in Toruń. On July 14, 1945, Dr. Iwanowska and about 200 other staff members from USB were transferred to Toruń. Iwanowska and the other scientists were successful in establishing a university in Toruń. On August 26, 1945, the Nicolaus Copernicus University was founded which included two departments, astronomy and astrophysics. She was one of the founders the Nicolaus Copernicus University and the Toruń School of Astronomy and Radioastronomy and helped develop many of their programs. In 1946, Wilhemina Iwanowska became the first astrophysics professor in Poland.

Dr. Iwanowska was the head of the observatory in Toruń from 1952 to 1976, which was the year of her retirement. Under her management, Dr. Iwanowska promoted nineteen doctors. Additionally, eight of her students went on to become professors.

Dr. Iwanowska was a frequent visitor of many observatories across Europe. She also visited the United States and Canada. During the month of January in 1973, Dr. Iwanowska was an honored guest of the Canadian National Nicolaus Copernicus Quincentenary Committee, the Royal Astronomical Society of Canada, and the National Research Council.

Notable research 

 In the course of her research, Dr. Iwanowska discovered a new scale of distance in the universe, which is considered her greatest achievement.
 In 1933, Dr. Iwanowska defended her doctoral thesis on two-color photographic observations.
 In 1937, she presented her habilitation thesis in which "she characterized stellar supergiants based on the analysis of their spectral features."
 Dr. Iwanowska's scientific bibliography includes approximately 150 works.

Honors & distinctions 

 From 1973 to 1979, Iwanowska was the vice president of the International Astronomical Union.
 Iwanowska was also a member of the Polish Academy of Sciences.
 Iwanowska became the first Director of the Institute of Astronomy of the Copernicus University in Toruń.
 Iwanowska was an honorary doctorate at three universities, one in Winnipeg, another in Leicester, and the last in Toruń.
In 1995, she was awarded the Great Cross of the Order of Polonia Restituta. 
In 1973, she became an honorary citizen of Winnipeg. 
In 1997, she became an honorary citizen in Toruń. 
The Pope gave her the medal "Pro Ecclesia et Pontifice".
Asteroid 198820 is named in Prof. Iwanowska's memory.

Death 
Wilhemina Iwanowska died on May 16, 1999. She was buried in Toruń beside her mother, sister, and niece.

References

External links 
Andrzej Woszczyk: Wilhelmina Iwanowska (1905-1999). Rocznik Toruński 26 (1999).

1905 births
1999 deaths
Scientists from Vilnius
People from Vilensky Uyezd
20th-century Polish astronomers
Vilnius University alumni
Academic staff of Nicolaus Copernicus University in Toruń
Members of the Polish Academy of Sciences